A mace (Hong Kong English usage: tsin; Southeast Asian English usage: chee) is a traditional Chinese measurement of weight in East Asia that was also used as a currency denomination. A troy mace is approximately 3.7429 grams. In Hong Kong, one mace is 3.779936375 grams. and in Ordinance 22 of 1884, it is  ounces avoirdupois. In Singapore, one mace (referred to as chee) is 3.77994 grams.

A common denomination was 7 mace and 2 candareens, equal to one silver Chinese yuan.

Name
Like other similar measures such as tael and catty, the English word "mace" derives from Malay, in this case through Dutch maes, plural masen, from Malay mas which, in turn, derived from Sanskrit , a word related to "mash," another name for the urad bean, and masha, a traditional Indian unit of weight equal to 0.97 gram. This word is unrelated to other uses of mace in English.

The Chinese word for mace is qian, which is also a generic word for "money" in Mandarin Chinese.

See also

 Chinese units of measurement
 Economic history of China (Pre-1911)
 Economic history of China (1912–1949)
 Economy of China
 Hong Kong units of measurement
 Taiwanese units of measurement

References 

 
 

Currencies of China
Currencies of Asia
Modern obsolete currencies
Chinese units in Hong Kong
Units of mass